Felix Groß (anglicised as Gross; born 4 September 1998) is a German cyclist, who currently rides for UCI Continental team . He rode in the men's team pursuit event at the 2018 UCI Track Cycling World Championships.

In May 2021, Groß signed a three-year contract with UCI WorldTeam , to commence from the start of the 2022 season. Prior to this, Groß will ride for the team as a stagiaire in the second half of the 2021 season.

Major results
Sources:

2016
 National Junior Road Championships
1st  Road race
3rd Time trial
 9th Time trial, UEC European Junior Road Championships
2018
 3rd  Time trial, Military World Games
2019
 1st An der Red Bull Arena
 1st Stage 2 Oderrundfahrt
2020
 1st Puchar Ministra Obrony Narodowej
 4th Overall Dookoła Mazowsza
1st  Points classification
1st  Young rider classification
1st Stages 2 (ITT) & 4

References

External links

1998 births
Living people
German male cyclists
Olympic cyclists of Germany
Cyclists at the 2020 Summer Olympics
German track cyclists
People from Ansbach (district)
Sportspeople from Middle Franconia
Cyclists from Bavaria